is a Japanese footballer currently playing as a defender for Mito HollyHock.

Career statistics

Club
.

Notes

References

External links

1998 births
Living people
Kansai University alumni
Japanese footballers
Association football defenders
J2 League players
Kyoto Sanga FC players